Abu Qirqas or Abu Qurqas is a subdivision (markaz) of Minya Governorate of Egypt. It is situated on the west bank of the Nile, opposite of the historic site of Beni Hasan.

The population of Abu Qirqas is around 400,000 inhabitants. The city has an important sugar factory.

Name 
The  Late Coptic: , probably from   Late Coptic: .

Administrative divisions 

Abu Qirqas comprises eight local administrative units:

 Abioha
 Abu Qirqas El Balad
 Atlidem
 Beni Ebeid
 Beni Hassan El Shorouk
 Beni Moussa
 Greis
 Nazlet Asmant
 gawargy

Coptic Catholic Eparchy 
On 2020.1.7 an Eparchy (Eastern Catholic Diocese) of Abu Qurqas was established on territory split off from the Minya. Its episcopal see is Cathédrale Saint-Antoine et Saint-Paul.

 Suffragan Eparchs (Bishops of Abu Qurqas)

 Bechara Giuda Matarana, O.F.M. (7 January 2020 - present)

References

External links 

 http://www.gcatholic.org/dioceses/diocese/abuq0.htm

Populated places in Minya Governorate